The 2011–12 Nemzeti Bajnokság I, also known as NB I for short, was the 110th season of top-tier football in Hungary. The league was officially named OTP Bank Liga for sponsorship reasons. The season began on 15 July 2011 and ended on 27 May 2012. Videoton were the defending champions, having won their first Hungarian championship at the end of the 2010–11 season.

Teams
Szolnok and MTK finished the 2010–11 season in the bottom two places of the table and thus were relegated to their respective NB II divisions. MTK ended a 16-year stay in the top league, while Szolnok were relegated after just one year in the league.

The two relegated teams were replaced with the champions of the two 2010–11 NB II groups, Diósgyőr of the East Group and Pécs of the West Group. Diósgyőr made their immediate comeback to the league, while Pécs returned to the competition after an absence of four seasons.

Stadia and locations

Personnel and kits

Note: Flags indicate national team as has been defined under FIFA eligibility rules. Players may hold more than one non-FIFA nationality.

Notes
1 Lajos Détári was the leader of the coaching staff, but he didn't have the necessary licence.
2 Károly Horváth was the leader of the coaching staff, but he didn't have the necessary licence.
3 From 11 April Marc Leliévre was the caretaker manager of Újpest.

Managerial changes

Notes
1 Between 15 and 30 August Tamás Nagy was the caretaker manager of Ferencváros.
2 Between 23 November and 13 December István László Szabó was the caretaker manager of Kecskemét.
3 From 11 April Marc Leliévre was the caretaker manager of Újpest.

League table

Positions by round

Results

Top goalscorers
Including matches played on 27 May 2012; Source: MLSZ (Click on "Góllövő lista")

Hat-tricks

Five goals in a match

References

External links
 Official site 

Nemzeti Bajnokság I seasons
1
Hungary